Westminster Christian School may refer to:

 Westminster Christian School (Florida)
 Westminster Christian School (Elgin, Illinois)